Igor Davidovich Oistrakh (27 April 1931 – 14 August 2021) was a Soviet and Russian violinist. He was described by Encyclopædia Britannica as "noted for his lean, modernist interpretations".

Life and career

Oistrakh was born in Odessa, Ukrainian SSR, the son of Tamara Rotareva and the violinist David Oistrakh. He began studying violin with Valeria Merenbloom at age 6, though his main teacher was his father. In 1943, the 12-year-old Oistrakh enrolled in the Central Music School, Moscow, studying with Pyotr Stolyarsky who had taught both his father and Nathan Milstein. He made his concert debut in 1948; the next year he won the International Violin Competition in Budapest and enrolled in the Moscow State Tchaikovsky Conservatory. He won the Henryk Wieniawski Violin Competition in 1952 and graduated from Moscow Conservatory in 1955.

He then joined the faculty of the Conservatory in 1958, becoming a lecturer in 1965. Beginning in 1996, Oistrakh held the post of Professor of the Royal Conservatory in Brussels.

Oistrakh appeared frequently internationally, both as a soloist and in joint recitals with his father, or with his father conducting. His wife Natalya Zertsalova is a pianist and has performed with him. Their son, Valery, is an active violist.

On 14 August 2021, Oistrakh died at age 90; however, media generally reported this on 1 September 2021.

Oistrakh was overshadowed by the fame of his father. The asteroid 42516 Oistrach was named in his and his father's honour.

References

1931 births
2021 deaths
Ukrainian classical violinists
Musicians from Odesa
Soviet classical violinists
20th-century classical violinists
Male classical violinists
Henryk Wieniawski Violin Competition prize-winners
Moscow Conservatory alumni
Academic staff of the Royal Conservatory of Brussels
Jewish classical violinists
21st-century classical violinists
20th-century male musicians
21st-century male musicians
Jewish Ukrainian musicians
Odesa Jews
Russian classical violinists
Russian classical musicians
Academic staff of Moscow Conservatory
Russian Jews
Soviet Jews
Classical violists
20th-century violists
21st-century violists